Uri Martins Sandoval (born 7 August 1990) is a Mexican former professional road cyclist.

Major results
2011
 National Under-23 Road Championships
1st  Time trial
2nd Road race
2014
 7th Overall Vuelta Mexico
2015
 4th Road race, National Road Championships
2017
 National Road Championships
3rd Road race
3rd Time trial

See also
List of people from Morelos, Mexico

References

1990 births
Living people
Mexican male cyclists
Sportspeople from Cuernavaca